The Greater Nile Petroleum Oil Company Tower, also known as GNPOC Headquarters, is a high-rise building in Khartoum, Sudan. The building was designed by KEO International Consultants.

References

Buildings and structures in Khartoum
Buildings and structures completed in 2010
2010 establishments in Sudan